William Edgar Fulton (born August 29, 1939) is an American mathematician, specializing in algebraic geometry.

Education and career
He received his undergraduate degree from Brown University in 1961 and his doctorate from Princeton University in 1966.  His Ph.D. thesis, written under the supervision of Gerard Washnitzer, was on The fundamental group of an algebraic curve.

Fulton worked at Princeton and Brandeis University from 1965 until 1970, when he began teaching at Brown.  In 1987 he moved to the University of Chicago.  He is, as of 2011, a professor at the University of Michigan.

Fulton is known as the author or coauthor of a number of popular texts, including Algebraic Curves and Representation Theory.

Awards and honors
In 1996 he received the Steele Prize for mathematical exposition for his text Intersection Theory.  Fulton is a member of the United States National Academy of Sciences since 1997; a fellow of the American Academy of Arts and Sciences from 1998, and was elected a foreign member of the Royal Swedish Academy of Sciences in 2000. In 2010, he was awarded the Steele Prize for Lifetime Achievement. In 2012 he became a fellow of the American Mathematical Society.

Selected works
 Algebraic Curves: An Introduction To Algebraic Geometry, with Richard Weiss.  New York: Benjamin, 1969.  Reprint ed.: Redwood City, CA, USA: Addison-Wesley, Advanced Book Classics, 1989.  .  Full text online.

See also
 Fulton–Hansen connectedness theorem

References

External links
 Fulton's home page at the University of Michigan

1939 births
Living people
20th-century American mathematicians
21st-century American mathematicians
Algebraic geometers
Fellows of the American Mathematical Society
Members of the United States National Academy of Sciences
Members of the Royal Swedish Academy of Sciences
Princeton University alumni
University of Michigan faculty
People from Naugatuck, Connecticut
Mathematicians from Connecticut
Brandeis University faculty
Fellows of the American Academy of Arts and Sciences